In enzymology, a L-aspartate oxidase is an enzyme that catalyzes the chemical reaction

L-aspartate + H2O + O2  oxaloacetate + NH3 + H2O2

The 3 substrates of this enzyme are L-aspartate, H2O, and O2, whereas its 3 products are oxaloacetate, NH3, and H2O2.

This enzyme belongs to the family of oxidoreductases, specifically those acting on the CH-NH2 group of donors with oxygen as acceptor.  The systematic name of this enzyme class is L-aspartate:oxygen oxidoreductase (deaminating). This enzyme participates in alanine and aspartate metabolism and nicotinate and nicotinamide metabolism.  It employs one cofactor, FAD.

Structural studies

References

 

EC 1.4.3
Flavoproteins
Enzymes of known structure